List players of Polish men's volleyball national team, who received individual awards in volleyball tournaments.

Official tournaments

Friendly tournaments

References

Polish men's volleyball national team
 
Men's European Volleyball Championships